Penfibre Sdn. Bhd. is a company under the supervision of Toray Industries (Malaysia) Sdn. Berhad, the subsidiaries of Toray Industries. Founded in 1973. In 1998, the company started to manufacture polyester film under the brand of Toray Lumiror Polyster. The plant has a capacity for producing 60,000 tons of polyester staple fibre a year. The company was divided into 2 different divisions, Penfibre Film and Penfibre Fibre.

History
 1973 - Establishment of Penfibre Sdn. Berhad (Malaysia) - Fibre Division
 1974 - The first polyester staple fibre factory in ASEAN began its production.
 1997 - Established of Penfibre Sdn. Berhad (Malaysia) - Film Division
 1998 - Film Division started commence production for Polyester Film "Lumirror"

Division

Penfibre Film Division
Specialized in BOPET (POLYESTER) FILM manufacturing plant under the trademark of Lumirror.

Penfibre Fibre Division
Has a capacity for producing 60,000 tons of polyester staple fibre a year.

References

1973 establishments in Malaysia
Companies based in Penang
Privately held companies of Malaysia
Toray Industries